Nikita Cuffe (born 26 September 1979) is an Australian water polo player. She was a member of the Australia women's national water polo team that won a bronze medal at the 2008 Beijing Olympics.

See also
 List of Olympic medalists in water polo (women)
 List of World Aquatics Championships medalists in water polo

References

External links
 

1979 births
Living people
Australian female water polo players
Olympic bronze medalists for Australia in water polo
Water polo players at the 2004 Summer Olympics
Water polo players at the 2008 Summer Olympics
Medalists at the 2008 Summer Olympics
20th-century Australian women
21st-century Australian women
Sportspeople from Brisbane
Sportswomen from Queensland